Vangueria burnettii is a species of flowering plant in the family Rubiaceae. It is endemic to southern Tanzania and Zambia.

References

External links 
 World Checklist of Rubiaceae

Flora of Tanzania
Flora of Zambia
burnettii